Third Force was a loosely organized non-aligned political movement in Iran which advocated an independent, socialist–nationalist philosophy of development. Though not a modern party, it maintained organization within activists and press. It did not become an important party, however made an enormous impact on Iranian democracy struggle after 1953 Iranian coup d'état.

The group was established in 1948 as a breakaway split from the communist Tudeh Party of Iran, when they rejected the party's Stalinism and pro-soviet oil concession stance in favor of democratic socialism and centrist Marxism, supporting nationalization of the Iran oil industry movement. They backed National Front and in 1951, joined socialist Toilers Party of the Iranian Nation, led by Mozzafar Baghai. Third Force split from the party in October 1952, after they positioned against Government of Mosaddegh.

According to leader Khalil Maleki, the group functioned through two basic principles, being a "Third Force in general", meaning to pursue an independent path from Western and Eastern blocs; and a "Third Force in particular", i.e. application of the third way in local circumstances.

In 1960, it was merged into the League of Iranian Socialists of the National Movement of Iran.

References

1948 establishments in Iran
1960 disestablishments in Iran
Anti-imperialist organizations
Defunct nationalist parties
Defunct socialist parties in Iran
Iranian nationalism
National Front (Iran) affiliated parties
Nationalist parties in Iran
Political parties disestablished in 1960
Political parties established in 1948
Political parties in Pahlavi Iran (1941–1979)